The Natal sand frog (Tomopterna natalensis) is a species of frog in the family Pyxicephalidae.
It is found in Mozambique, South Africa, and Eswatini, and possibly Botswana, Lesotho, and Zimbabwe. Its natural habitats are dry savanna, moist savanna, subtropical or tropical moist shrubland, temperate grassland, subtropical or tropical dry lowland grassland, subtropical or tropical high-altitude grassland, rivers, intermittent rivers, swamps, freshwater marshes, intermittent freshwater marshes, arable land, pastureland, and ponds.

References

Tomopterna
Taxonomy articles created by Polbot
Amphibians described in 1849